The 2009 New Brunswick Scotties Tournament of Hearts, New Brunswick's women's provincial curling championship, was held January 28 to February 1 at the Beaver Curling Club in Moncton. The winning Andrea Kelly team represented team New Brunswick at the 2009 Scotties Tournament of Hearts in Victoria, British Columbia.

Teams

Final round-robin standings

Playoffs

Semifinal
Saturday, January 31, 7:00 pm

Final
Sunday, February 1, 2:00 pm

New Brunswick
Curling competitions in Moncton
2009 in New Brunswick